

Arthropods

Insects

Vertebrates

Data courtesy of George Olshevsky's dinosaur genera list.

Popular culture

Amusement parks and attractions
 August 28th: The Calgary Zoo's Prehistoric Park opened. Paleontologist Darren Tanke has described Prehistoric Park as "an extensive treed park and pathways containing numerous life-sized concrete dinosaurs and other prehistoric life". It also had "two long, walkthrough display buildings containing a Corythosaurus skeleton and individual dinosaur bones", as well as exhibits of paleozoic invertebrates and prehistoric plants. It became a popular attraction among visitors to the zoo.

Literature
 In 1937, Morant imagined a feathered dinosaur-like animal that lived during the Triassic and glided about on four wings. This portrayal reflected contemporary scientific speculations attempting to reconstruct the hypothetical ancestor of birds. Fossils from China later revealed the existence of just this sort of animal.

References

1930s in paleontology
Paleontology 7